The Barrios Rocks are a small group of rocks lying  west of Toro Point, Trinity Peninsula. The name "Islote Barrios" was given by the First Chilean Antarctic Expedition (1947–48) after General Guillermo Barrios Tirado, minister of national defense who accompanied the Presidential Antarctic Expedition (1948) to this area in the Transporter Presidente Pinto. Air photographs of this feature appear to show three small rocks closely juxtaposed.

References 

Rock formations of the Trinity Peninsula